Germany saw significant political violence from the fall of the Empire and the rise of the Republic through the German Revolution of 1918–1919, until the rise of the Nazi Party to power with 1933 elections and the proclamation of the Enabling Act of 1933 that fully broke down all opposition.

Further reading

See also
 Adolf Hitler's rise to power
 Beer Hall Putsch
 German Revolution of 1918–1919
 Revolutions of 1917–1923

References

German Revolution of 1918–1919
Political repression in Germany
Political violence in Germany
Politics of the Weimar Republic
Protests in Germany
Rebellions in Germany
Revolutions of 1917–1923
Subsidiary conflicts of World War I